Bisonalveus is an extinct genus of shrew-like mammals that were presumably ground-dwelling and fed on plants and insects. Bisonalveus fossils have been discovered in the upper Great Plains region of North America, including sites in modern-day Wyoming, North Dakota, Montana, and Alberta. The fossils have been dated to 60 million years ago, during the Tiffanian North American Stage of the Palaeocene epoch. Bisonalveus is the last known genus of the Pentacodontinae sub-family to have arisen, replacing the genus Coriphagus in the early Tiffanian. Bisonalveus itself appears to have gone extinct by the middle Tiffanian.

Bisonalveus is represented by two known species: B. browni (Gazin, 1956) and B. holtzmani (Gingerich, 1983).

Bisonalveus browni

Bisonalveus browni was discovered in 1956 from fossilized jaw fragments (including molars). Later discovered fossils included front teeth and a dagger-like canine tooth with an enameled groove. The canines do not have a corresponding surface on the lower jaw, indicating that they were not used for chewing, but rather for stabbing. That would mean Bisonalveus was a predator, presumably hunting small insects. The grooves on the canines may have been used for delivering venomous saliva into the prey, which would thereby make Bisonalveus one of the few known venomous mammals. Perhaps, like the modern solenodon, Bisonalveus bit its victims to inject its toxic saliva and buried the immobilized prey in a cache for later consumption. However, because several nonvenomous mammals (such as baboons and other primates) have similar grooves on their teeth, some scientists have questioned whether these grooves truly indicate venom delivery. If Bisonalveus was a forager, the grooves might have served the purpose of introducing (nonvenomous) saliva for digestive reasons. Alternatively, the grooves might have been useful as they increased the amount of enamel on the canines, thereby strengthening these slender teeth.

Bisonalveus holtzmani

Bisonalveus holtzmani is named for Dr. Richard Holtzman, who, in 1978, described the first tooth that was later determined to belong to this species. B. holtzmani can be distinguished from B. browni in that it is about 30% larger.

References

Cimolestans
Paleocene mammals
Paleocene genus extinctions
Prehistoric mammals of North America
Prehistoric mammal genera